The ANF Les Mureaux 110 and its derivatives were a family of French reconnaissance aircraft developed in the 1930s. They were all-metal, parasol-wing monoplanes that seated the pilot and observer in tandem open cockpits. The aircraft were widely used in the Battle of France, but were all scrapped soon thereafter.

Development
The ANF Les Mureaux 110 originated with a French air ministry requirement for an aircraft to replace the Breguet 19 in Armée de l'Air service in the "R2" two-seat reconnaissance role. Two slightly different variants, the 110 and 111 were presented to the air force for evaluation, and were soon ordered into production.

The first mass-production version was the 113 in 1933, of which 49 examples were purchased. This was supplanted in production by the 115 in 1935 and the 117 later than year. Both these series were given light bombing capability as well.

Operational history
The 113 entered service initially with the Armée de l'Air's reconnaissance Groupes, followed by the observation Groupes, and finally replacing the venerable Potez 25s in the Groupes Aériens Régionaux reserve units. It was followed into service by the 117 and 115. From 1934 to 35, 40 of the original 113s were converted into night fighters and used to replace the Breguet 19s still in service with France's two nightfighter Groupes.

By the outbreak of World War II, the 115 equipped nine Groupes Aériens d'Observation, and the 117 nine more. By April 1940, 11 aircraft had been lost in action, leaving 228 on strength at the commencement of the Blitzkrieg in May. By the time of the French armistice with Germany on June 25, only 62 remained, some of these in North Africa.

Variants
 110 - two examples built for evaluation, 1x Hispano-Suiza 12Nb engine.
 110A-2 - prototype, 1x Hispano-Suiza 12Nb engine.
 111 - one example built for evaluation, 1x Hispano-Suiza 12Nb engine.
 112 R2 - the 110 prototypes re-engined as pre-production machines, 1x Hispano-Suiza 12Ybrs engine.
 112 GR - one specially-built aircraft to participate in 1934 Bibescu Cup air race
 113 R2 - initial production version (Hispano-Suiza 12Ybrs) - 49 built
 113 CN - 40 113s converted into night fighters
 113 GR - racing version, equipped with a supercharged Hispano-Suiza 12Ybrs piston engine. Only one was built.
 114 CN - single prototype of a purpose-built night fighter version
 115 R2B2 - reconnaissance bomber with upgraded engine (119 built), 1x Hispano-Suiza 12Ycrs engine.
 115 R2 - this version was powered by a 634-kW (850-hp) Hispano-Suiza 12Yers piston engine.
 117 R2B2 - reconnaissance bomber with revised aerodynamics (115 built), 1x Hispano-Suiza 12Ybrs engine.
 119 - one 113 modified to challenge world altitude record with 500 kg payload, 1x Hispano-Suiza 12Ybrs engine.
 200A.3 - Prototype observation aircraft, 1x Hispano-Suiza 12Ycrs engine.

Operators

French Air Force

Specifications (115 R2B2)

See also

References

External links

 aviafrance.com
 airwar.ru

1930s French military reconnaissance aircraft
113
Single-engined tractor aircraft
Parasol-wing aircraft
Aircraft first flown in 1931